Khayr al-Din al-Ahdab was a Lebanese politician who served as Prime Minister of Lebanon from 1937 to 1938, becoming the first Muslim to hold the office. In about 1925 he started the newspaper The New Testament, and published another called Pan Arab.

References

Prime Ministers of Lebanon
Lebanese Sunni Muslims